The 2018–19 season was Doncaster Rovers' 140th season in their existence, 16th consecutive season in the Football League and second consecutive season in League One. Along with League One, the club also participated in the FA Cup, EFL Cup and EFL Trophy.

The season covered the period from 1 July 2018 to 30 June 2019.

Squad

Detailed overview 
League caps and goals up to the start of season 2018–19.
Players with name and squad number struck through and marked  left the club during the playing season.

Statistics 
This includes any players featured in a match day squad in any competition.

|}

Goals record
.

Disciplinary record
.

Transfers

Transfers in

Transfers out

Loans in

Loans out

Competitions

Friendlies
Doncaster Rovers announced pre-season friendlies against Alfreton Town, Frickley Athletic, Birmingham City and Sheffield United.

League One

League table

Results summary

Results by matchday

Matches

August

September

October

November

December

January

February

March

April

May

Play-offs

FA Cup

The first round draw was made live on BBC by Dennis Wise and Dion Dublin on 22 October. The draw for the second round was made live on BBC and BT by Mark Schwarzer and Glenn Murray on 12 November. The third round draw was made live on BBC by Ruud Gullit and Paul Ince from Stamford Bridge on 3 December 2018. The fourth round draw was made live on BBC by Robbie Keane and Carl Ikeme from Wolverhampton on 7 January 2019. The fifth round draw was broadcast on 28 January 2019 live on BBC, Alex Scott and Ian Wright conducted the draw.

EFL Cup

On 15 June 2018, the draw for the first round was made in Vietnam. The second round draw was made from the Stadium of Light on 16 August.

EFL Trophy
On 13 July 2018, the initial group stage draw bar the U21 invited clubs was announced.

References

Doncaster Rovers F.C. seasons
Doncaster Rovers